Brunswick railway station is located on the Upfield line in Victoria, Australia. It serves the northern Melbourne suburb of Brunswick, and it opened on 9 September 1884.

The station is listed on the Victorian Heritage Register.

History

Brunswick station opened on 9 September 1884, when the railway line from North Melbourne was extended to Coburg. Like the suburb itself, the station was named after Brunswick Park, a property that was purchased by Thomas Wilkinson and a partner. Brunswick Park was named in honour of either Princess Caroline of Brunswick, or the 1840 marriage of Queen Victoria to Prince Albert, of the royal house of Brunswick.

Brunswick once had a goods yard, which closed in 1966. The goods siding and associated points and signal discs were abolished in that same year.

In 1972, the station platforms were lengthened.

Just after 4:45am on 2 August 1977, a seven-car Harris train set rolled away from Gowrie, after the driver and guard were changing ends after taking the train out of a siding, as it was scheduled to operate a city bound service from Upfield. The train passed through fifteen level crossings and destroyed seven sets of hand gates, before stopping just south of Brunswick, between the Albert and Dawson Streets level crossings.

Announced in September 2022, Brunswick, alongside other stations on the Upfield line, will be elevated to remove eight level crossings on the line. Further details, designs and a construction timeline will be released closer to 2027.

Platforms and services

Brunswick has two side platforms. It is serviced by Metro Trains' Upfield line services.

Platform 1:
  all stations services to Flinders Street

Platform 2:
  all stations services to Upfield

Transport links

Dysons operates two routes via Brunswick station, under contract to Public Transport Victoria:
 : Alphington station – Moonee Ponds Junction
 : Brunswick West – Barkly Square Shopping Centre

Ventura Bus Lines operates one route to and from Brunswick station, under contract to Public Transport Victoria:
  : to Glenroy station (Saturday and Sunday mornings only)

Yarra Trams operates one route via Brunswick station:
 : North Coburg – Flinders Street station (Elizabeth Street CBD)

References

External links
 
 Melway map at street-directory.com.au

Listed railway stations in Australia
Railway stations in Melbourne
Railway stations in Australia opened in 1884
Heritage-listed buildings in Melbourne
Railway stations in the City of Merri-bek